Lars Johnsen can refer to:

 Lars Gunnar Johnsen (born 1991), Norwegian footballer
 Lars Kristian Johnsen (born 1970), Norwegian cyclist